The Dunajec; Goral dialects: Dónajec)) is a river running through northeastern Slovakia and southern Poland. It is also regarded as the main river of the Goral Lands. It is a right tributary of the Vistula River. It begins in Nowy Targ at the junction of two short mountain rivers, Czarny Dunajec and Biały Dunajec (Black and White Dunajec).

Geography
On the Slovak/Polish border, it flows through the Zamagurie region, with attractions such as the Dunajec River Gorge, the Trzy Korony massif with a  precipice, Červený Kláštor, and two Pieniny castles in Czorsztyn and Niedzica.

Below the two source streams Dunajec flows through a broad valley called Nowotarska Basin. It then supplies the waters of the dam in Niedzica (Jezioro Czorsztyńskie Lake) and the dam in Sromowce Wyżne (Sromowce Wyżne reservoir). Flowing through the central part of the Pieniny range, it creates a picturesque turn at the Polish Slovak border between Sromowce Wyżne and Szczawnica, where it flows by Kotuńka rock which differentiates the area from the over parts of the river. Further down it turns to the north into the Western Beskid Mountains, and Sądecka Basin (where it merges with its own largest tributary, the Poprad river). It flows across an open valley of the Beskid Foothills and falls down across Rożnów Foothills (with two more dams: the Jezioro Rożnowskie Lake, and Jezioro Czchowskie Lake) and finally, it leads into the Sandomierz Basin and the valley of Vistula Lowlands. Dunajec flows into the Vistula River in the vicinity of Opatowiec.

Towns and townships 

The Dunajec flows through or near these locations in Poland and north Slovakia:

Gallery

See also

 Dunajec River Gorge
 Rivers of Poland
 Rivers of Slovakia
 1934 flood in Poland
 Dunajec river castles

References

  Dunajec River at Encyclopædia Britannica

 
Rivers of Slovakia
Rivers of Poland
Rivers of Lesser Poland Voivodeship
Poland–Slovakia border
International rivers of Europe
Border rivers
Braided rivers in Europe